Lights of Old Broadway is a 1925 American silent drama film directed by Monta Bell, produced by William Randolph Hearst's Cosmopolitan Productions, and released by Metro-Goldwyn-Mayer. The film stars Marion Davies in a dual role and Conrad Nagel, and is an adaptation of the play The Merry Wives of Gotham by Laurence Eyre (USA). The film has color sequences using tinting, Technicolor, and the Handschiegl color process.

The play was produced on Broadway at Henry Miller's Theatre from January 16, 1924 to April 1924. Davies' role was played on the stage by actress Mary Ellis.

Plot
As described in a film magazine review, two young women, twins, whose mother dies while the family is en route from Ireland to the United States, are separated in New York City, Anne being adopted by a wealthy family and the other, Fely, by a poor family. Dirk, Anne's adopted brother, meets the poor sister, and love draws them together. The youth’s family objects to his romance, but are reconciled when the poor sister saves Dirk’s father from death, and the two are then wed. A subplot involves the coming of electricity to New York City.

Cast

Production
In her 21st film, Marion Davies starred as twins separated at birth. The dark-haired girl is brought up in a wealthy home, while the blonde is brought up in the tenement slums and becomes a musical-comedy star. This MGM production saw Davies in the first of three teamings with Conrad Nagel and was also the first Davies production in which Louis B. Mayer and Irving Thalberg became involved. This was the first Davies film to use 2-strip Technicolor (which survives). The finale also includes the same hand-coloring technique (Handschiegl) that had been used in When Knighthood Was in Flower. The film was a big hit and resulted in a long-term contract with MGM.

Preservation
Prints of Lights of Old Broadway are preserved at the Library of Congress and UCLA Film and Television Archive.

See also
List of early color feature films

References

External links

1925 films
1920s color films
Metro-Goldwyn-Mayer films
American silent feature films
1925 drama films
Films set in New York (state)
Silent films in color
Silent American drama films
1920s American films